Graby may refer to the following places:
Graby, Greater Poland Voivodeship (west-central Poland)
Graby, Łódź Voivodeship (central Poland)
Graby, Świętokrzyskie Voivodeship (south-central Poland)
 Graby, Lincolnshire, shrunken village in the parish of Dowsby, Lincolnshire, England